"We Light the Way" is the fifth episode of the first season of the HBO fantasy drama television series House of the Dragon. Its title is the motto of House Hightower, one of the fictional noble families featured in the series. It was written by Charmaine DeGraté, and directed by Clare Kilner, and was first aired on September 18, 2022.

The plot depicts Daemon visiting his estranged wife, Rhea Royce, in the Vale and the wedding of Princess Rhaenyra Targaryen and Ser Laenor Velaryon.

It received generally positive reviews, with critics praising Emily Carey's performance, the conversation between Laenor and Rhaenyra at Driftmark, and the wedding sequence. Nevertheless, the portrayal of Joffrey Lonmouth's death received criticism from critics and fans alike, which was perceived as another case of the "bury your gays" trope.

Plot
In the Vale, Daemon Targaryen murders his estranged wife, Lady Rhea Royce, framing her death as a hunting accident.

King Viserys and Princess Rhaenyra sail to Driftmark to arrange the princess's marriage to Ser Laenor Velaryon, the son of Lord Corlys and Princess Rhaenys, thus uniting the Targaryens and Velaryon Houses. Knowing Laenor is gay, Rhaenyra says that, once married, they can perform their royal duties and be free to have lovers. Later, Ser Criston Cole proposes that he and Rhaenyra run away to Essos and assume new identities. Rhaenyra refuses to give up the throne and says they can continue their current relationship. Criston feels used and despairs over breaking his Kingsguard vows.

Before leaving King's Landing, Ser Otto Hightower warns Alicent that if Rhaenyra becomes queen, Alicent's children will be considered a dangerous political threat to the throne. Ser Larys Strong slyly asks Alicent about Rhaenyra's health, mentioning she was given a medicinal drink. Alicent questions Criston about allegations that Rhaenyra and Daemon had sex; Criston, misunderstanding, confesses that he slept with the princess. Criston expects execution, but Alicent merely dismisses him and keeps the secret; Rhaenyra's dishonesty distresses Alicent.

At a feast celebrating Rhaenyra and Laenor's forthcoming nuptials, Alicent interrupts Viserys' speech, entering the hall wearing a green gown matching House Hightower's signal color for a call to arms. Her uncle, Lord Hobert, promises her full political support. Daemon unexpectedly attends the feast. Ser Gerold Royce confronts him, claiming he murdered Rhea. Daemon denies it and demands he inherit Rhea's lands. Daemon flirts with Lady Laena, Lord Corlys's daughter. Daemon privately questions Rhaenyra about her marriage; she teasingly suggests they wed.

Laenor's lover, Ser Joffrey Lonmouth, realizes that Criston is Rhaenyra's paramour. Joffrey tells Criston that they should protect the wedding couple's secrets. Criston perceives this as blackmail and brutally beats Joffrey to death, bringing the feast to a disastrous end and devastating Laenor. Rhaenyra and Laenor are hastily wed in a private ceremony the same night. The frail Viserys collapses immediately after the ceremony. Later, as Criston is about to commit suicide over his misdeeds, Queen Alicent interrupts him.

Production

Writing 
"We Light the Way" was written by Charmaine DeGraté, marking her first time in the Game of Thrones franchise.

The title of the episode refers to the motto of House Hightower, one of the fictional noble families featured in the series.

Filming 
The episode was directed by Clare Kilner, making it her second directorial credit for the series, following the previous episode "King of the Narrow Sea".

Castleton, a village located in Derbyshire, England, served as the location for the opening scene in the Vale, while the scenes at Driftmark were filmed on St. Michael's Mount island, in Mount's Bay, Cornwall, England.

Casting 
The episode stars Paddy Considine, Matt Smith, Rhys Ifans, Steve Toussaint, Eve Best, Fabien Frankel, Milly Alcock, Emily Carey, Graham McTavish, Matthew Needham, and Jefferson Hall. It marks the final appearance of Alcock as young Rhaenyra Targaryen, Carey as young Alicent Hightower, and Theo Nate as young Laenor Velaryon, due to the 10-year time jump between this and the succeeding episode, in which Rhaenyra, Alicent, and Laenor are portrayed as adults by Emma D'Arcy, Olivia Cooke, and John Macmillan, respectively. It also marks the first and only appearance of Savannah Steyn as the teenage Laena Velaryon, who was portrayed as a younger child by Nova Foueillis-Mose in the first and second episodes, in which the adult version will be subsequently portrayed by Nanna Blondell; and the final appearance of David Horovitch as Grand Maester Mellos who is later confirmed to have died sometime in between the time jump.

Reception

Ratings
An estimated 1.83 million viewers watched "We Light the Way" during its first broadcast on HBO. 2.58 million viewers watched the episode across its four broadcasts on HBO, an increase of around 4% from the previous episode. The viewership of the episode on all platforms in the US was 3% more than the fourth episode.

Critical response
The episode received generally positive reviews. On the review aggregator Rotten Tomatoes, it holds an approval rating of 85% based on 107 reviews, with an average rating of 7.5/10. The website's critical consensus said, "Holding true to the Westerosi rule that no wedding goes according to plan, 'We Light the Way' is a disturbing midpoint for House of the Dragon, punctuated by shocking brutality and Queen Alicent coming into her own."

The episode received a rating of 5 out of 5 stars from Michael Deacon of The Telegraph, 4 out of 5 stars from Molly Edwards of GamesRadar+ and 3 out of 5 stars from Alec Bojalad of Den of Geek, a "B-" grade from Jenna Scherer of The A.V. Club, and a "good" score of 7 out of 10 from Helen O'Hara of IGN. In his review, Deacon called the episode "the most action-packed, and best, installment to date" and praised Rhaenyra's character development. Edwards said, "We've crossed the halfway point of House of the Dragon’s first season, and, as we head into that final stretch of episodes, the battle lines have been drawn. [...] The board is set for the wars to come – and that legendary Targaryen dynasty is more fragile than ever," and further praised Carey's performance." Bojalad criticized the characterization of Ser Criston Cole in the episode, but praised the conversation between Rhaenyra and Laenor at Driftmark, and summarized his review by saying, "House of the Dragon is at its best when viewers can feel the weight of history pressing down upon every moment. It’s why most of the various conversations and negotiations in the episode work. It’s also why the more literal, kinetic moments don’t. When the mere sight of a young woman wearing a green dress is enough to bring an entire wedding to a grinding halt, we don't need Ser Criston Cole to crush some other guy's face in for good measure. As House of the Dragon continues on, hopefully it will pick up on that lesson and let our imaginations run free." O'Hara wrote in her verdict, "This week has another talky episode, but one that further exposes the schisms in the Targaryen clan. [...] But excellent performances keep it interesting, especially from Milly Alcock and Emily Carey as they wind up their run before the big time jump."

However, the episode drew criticism from critics and fans alike for its portrayal of the death of Joffrey and its supposed use of the "bury your gays" trope, a pattern by which LGBT characters in film and TV are killed off at a much higher rate than heterosexual characters because they are deemed more expendable.

References

External links

 "We Light the Way" at HBO
 

2022 American television episodes
House of the Dragon episodes
Television episodes about weddings
Uxoricide in fiction